Robert Alexander Harrison,  (August 3, 1833 – November 1, 1878) was an Ontario lawyer, judge and political figure. He represented West Toronto in the 1st Canadian Parliament as a Conservative member.

Early life 
Harrison was born in Montreal, Lower Canada in 1833, the son of Irish immigrants. The family moved to Markham Township and then Toronto. Harrison studied at Upper Canada College and Trinity College, Toronto. He studied law and was called to the bar in 1855.

Career 
He served as chief clerk of the Crown Law Department from 1854 to 1859; and then entered private practice. In 1867, Harrison was named Queen's Counsel. He served on Toronto city council in 1867 and 1868.  He was also a director of the Toronto, Grey and Bruce Railway. In 1875, he was named chief justice for the Court of Queen's Bench of Ontario.

Harrison contributed articles to several legal journals and newspapers, serving for a time as joint editor for the Upper Canada Law Journal. He was one of the arbitrators involved in establishing the western boundary for the province of Ontario.

Death 
Harrison died in Toronto in 1878, at the age of 45.

Family
On 2 June 1859 Alexander first married Anna Eliza Muckle.  In Toronto, Ontario, on 11 August 1864, they had their daughter, Anna.  On 26 March 1866, wife Anna died.  In 1868 Robert remarried.  The second wife of Hon. Robert A. Harrison, U.C.L., Chief Justice of Ontario, was Kennithina Johana Mackay, daughter of Hugh Scobie, editor of the British Colonist. The couple had one daughter, Justine A. Harrison, who was born in Toronto, and educated, mainly, abroad. While living at Dresden she studied Dresden decoration under Lamm, Ley Kauf and Mrs. Wagner.

References

 
The Canadian portrait gallery, JC Dent (1881)
The lives of the judges of Upper Canada and Ontario..., DB Read (1888)

External links
 

1833 births
1878 deaths
Conservative Party of Canada (1867–1942) MPs
Members of the House of Commons of Canada from Ontario
Justices of the Court of Appeal for Ontario
Trinity College (Canada) alumni
University of Toronto alumni
Canadian King's Counsel